Vasile Chiroiu (August 13, 1910 – May 9, 1976) was a Romanian football defender who played for Romania in the 1938 FIFA World Cup.

Honours
Ripensia Timişoara
Liga I (2): 1935–36, 1937–38
Cupa României (1): 1935–36

References

External links
 
 
 

1910 births
Romanian footballers
Romania international footballers
Association football defenders
Liga I players
FC Politehnica Timișoara players
FC Rapid București players
FC Ripensia Timișoara players
CA Oradea players
1938 FIFA World Cup players
1976 deaths
CAM Timișoara players
People from Timiș County